Stenonemobius is a genus of cricket in the subfamily Nemobiinae; species can be found in North Africa, South-East Europe and Asia.

Taxonomy
The Orthoptera Species File database lists the following subgenera and species:
Subgenus Ocellonemobius  Gorochov, 1984
Stenonemobius acrobatus (Saussure, 1877)
Stenonemobius bicolor (Saussure, 1877)
Subgenus Stenonemobius Gorochov, 1981
Stenonemobius gracilis (Jakovlev, 1871)
Stenonemobius adelungi (Uvarov, 1912)
Stenonemobius mayeti (Finot, 1893)

References

Ground crickets